Elections to Moyle District Council were held on 17 May 1989 on the same day as the other Northern Irish local government elections. The election used three district electoral areas to elect a total of 15 councillors.

Election results

Note: "Votes" are the first preference votes.

Districts summary

|- class="unsortable" align="centre"
!rowspan=2 align="left"|Ward
! % 
!Cllrs
! % 
!Cllrs
! %
!Cllrs
! %
!Cllrs
! % 
!Cllrs
!rowspan=2|TotalCllrs
|- class="unsortable" align="center"
!colspan=2 bgcolor="" | SDLP
!colspan=2 bgcolor="" | DUP
!colspan=2 bgcolor="" | UUP
!colspan=2 bgcolor="" | Sinn Féin
!colspan=2 bgcolor="white"| Others
|-
|align="left"|Ballycastle
|25.2
|1
|20.5
|1
|11.6
|1
|0.0
|0
|bgcolor="#DDDDDD"|42.7
|bgcolor="#DDDDDD"|2
|5
|-
|align="left"|Giant's Causeway
|0.0
|0
|29.3
|2
|17.6
|1
|0.0
|0
|bgcolor="#0077FF"|53.1
|bgcolor="#0077FF"|2
|5
|-
|align="left"|The Glens
|bgcolor="#99FF66"|55.1
|bgcolor="#99FF66"|3
|10.8
|0
|0.0
|0
|14.2
|1
|19.9
|1
|5
|-
|- class="unsortable" class="sortbottom" style="background:#C9C9C9"
|align="left"| Total
|29.6
|4
|19.3
|3
|8.8
|2
|5.6
|1
|36.7
|5
|15
|-
|}

District results

Ballycastle

1985: 1 x SDLP, 1 x DUP, 1 x UUP, 1 x Sinn Féin, 1 x Independent
1989: 2 x Independent, 1 x SDLP, 1 x DUP, 1 x UUP
1985-1989 Change: Independent gain from Sinn Féin

Giant's Causeway

1985: 2 x Independent Unionist, 2 x DUP, 1 x UUP
1989: 2 x Independent Unionist, 2 x DUP, 1 x UUP
1985-1989 Change: No change

The Glens

1985: 3 x SDLP, 1 x Sinn Féin, 1 x Independent Nationalist
1989: 3 x SDLP, 1 x Sinn Féin, 1 x Independent Nationalist
1985-1989 Change: No change

References

Moyle District Council elections
Moyle